Herrmann Nunatak is a nunatak  northeast of the east end of the Phillips Mountains, in Marie Byrd Land, Antarctica. It was discovered and mapped by the United States Antarctic Service (1939–41), and was named by the Advisory Committee on Antarctic Names for John Herrmann, a photographer with the Byrd Antarctic Expedition (1933–35).

References

Nunataks of Marie Byrd Land